The South Campus is one of University of Copenhagen's four campuses in Copenhagen, Denmark. It is situated on Amager just south of Njalsgade, between Ørestad Boulevard and Amager Fælledvej, forming the northernmost part of Ørestad. It is home to the Faculty of Humanities which will later be joined by the Faculty of Theology and the Faculty of Law. Once completed, the campus will be home to about 12,000 students and researchers.

History
Built between 1972 and 1979 to a Brutalist design by Eva and Nils Koppel, Københavns Universitet Amager, was originally only built as a temporary home for the Facility of the Humanities. As time progressed became a permanent solution and it was instead decided to expand and modernize the complex. In 1997, KHR Arkitekter won an architectural competition for the first phase of the expansion, KUA1, which was completed in 2001.

The original KUA buildings will largely be demolished in connection with phase 2 and 3. The second phase of the expansion was designed by Arkitema and completed in 2013. The third phase is expected to open in 2015

Buildings
KUA1 consists of a series of long, six-storey buildings with a pale, travertine cladding.

KUA2 reused structural elements from the original KUA buildings but adapted them with a cladding similar to the one used on KUA1. They have also been connected by more transparent, intersecting wings.

Outdoor spaces
The 20,000-square-metre public plaza Karen Blixens Plads os a focal point for outdoor life in the area. Completed in 2019 to designs by local architectural firm Cobe, it is one of the largest public spaces of its kind in the city. It is named for noted 20th-century Danish author Karen Blixen.

A dominant feature of the plaza is the three "bicycle mounds" with provide parking for sheltered and concealed parking of 2,000 bicycles.  The domed structures are cast concrete shells with rounded openings, clad with hand-laid tiles in pale colours that match the exteriors of the surrounding buildings. Steps cut into the sides of the larger concrete hills allow the space to double as an outdoor auditorium, which can be used for concerts, performances and other public events.

A Rambla connects Karen Blixens Plads, in opposite directions, to Islands Brygge Metro Station and a new park, Grønningen, separating the campus area from the housing estates Boligslangen and Karen Blixens Have to the south.

Research Centres
Since 2013, the Centre for Advanced Migration Studies has been based at the South Campus.

Transport
Islands Brygge Station is located next to the campus, on the corner of Njalsgade and Ørestad Boulevard, serving the M1 line of the Copenhagen Metro.

References

External links

 

University of Copenhagen campuses
University and college campuses in Copenhagen
Amager